Turin Airport , also known as Turin-Caselle Airport (Aeroporto di Torino-Caselle), is an international airport located at Caselle Torinese,  north-northwest of the city of Turin, in the Metropolitan City of Turin, Piedmont region, Northern Italy. It is also named Sandro Pertini Airport (Aeroporto Sandro Pertini), after former Italian President Sandro Pertini.

History 
The airport was built in 1953, on the site of a World War II air base, and was renovated in 1989 for the 1990 FIFA World Cup and then again in 2005 in preparation for the 2006 Winter Olympics. Turin airport won the ACI Europe Best Airport Awards in the category from 1 to 5 million passengers in 2007, 2008 and 2022. The aerodrome is operated by Società Azionaria Gestione Aeroporto Torino S.p.A. and administered by the Italian Civil Aviation Authority (ENAC). The air traffic service (ATS) authority is ENAV S.p.A.

Facilities 
It covers an area of more than 57 thousand square meters. The Runway 36 is ILS (Instrument Landing System) certified III B for approach with visual range less than 200 meters (656 ft) but not less than 75 meters (246 ft).

Industry 
The airport is also home to two Leonardo plants (North and South): these sites are specialized in the assembly and final phase of production, maintenance, ground tests and flight tests of military and civil prototypes and aircraft. In particular, aircraft such as: AMX-ACOL, ATR 42 MP, ATR 72 MP, C-27J, Eurofighter, Tornado MLU and Sky-X are produced.

Airlines and destinations 

The following airlines operate regular scheduled and charter services at Turin Airport:

Statistics

Passengers

Routes

Ground transportation
The airport is connected by rail to the city of Turin by the Ferrovia Torino-Ceres, operated by GTT as line A of Turin metropolitan railway service and by shuttle bus, operated by SADEM.

There are also some scheduled shuttle services to nearby mountain towns and resorts including Ayas, Gressoney, Champorcher, Briançon, Vallée de la Clarée (Névache), Clavière, Cesana, Puy Saint Vincent, Montgenevre, and Serre Chevalier.

References

External links

 Official website
 Information about Turin Airport on Boeing website
 
 
 

Airports in Italy
Buildings and structures in the Metropolitan City of Turin
Transport in Turin
1953 establishments in Italy
Airports established in 1953
Airports in Piedmont